Hero No.1 is a 1997 Indian Hindi-language comedy film directed by David Dhawan. It stars Govinda and Karishma Kapoor with an ensemble supporting cast of actors. 

The film borrows the theme of Bawarchi, which was itself a remake of Bengali film Galpo Holeo Satti. It was remade in Telugu as Goppinti Alludu. The film promised to be the family one providing wholesome entertainment from 90s.

Plot
Rajesh, the son of rich businessman Dhanraj Malhotra, escapes from his home and reaches Europe. Meena, the granddaughter of Dinanath Tripathi, also travels to Europe as she has secured a scholarship to study there.
The two meet and fall in love. Dhanraj reaches Europe in search of Rajesh and discovers he loves Meena. They return to India for the two to get married. However, destiny has something else in store for them.

When Dinanath finds out about Rajesh being Dhanraj's son, he breaks the alliance in rage. As later Dinanath's servant Babu escapes, they're  now in search of new servant. Rajesh disguises as servant Raju and begins to work at the Tripathis. He solves the problems of family members also including Dinanath's 3 sons, daughter Shanno and other granddaughter Dimple, winning hearts of everyone.

Dinanath finds some valuables missing from the home. Police arrive and find Dhanraj, disguised as a Chowkidar. Raju and Dhanraj are insulted by the family members. Meena reveals Raju's identity and the sacrifices he made for her. Dinanath realises their true love for each other. The film ends happily with Rajesh and Meena's marriage.

Cast
Govinda as Rajesh "Raju" Malhotra
Karishma Kapoor as Meena Nath Tripathi
Kader Khan as Dhanraj Malhotra, Raju's father.
Paresh Rawal as Dinanath Tripathi, Meena's paternal grandfather.
Tiku Talsania as Vidyanath Dinanath Tripathi, Meena's eldest paternal uncle.
Anil Dhawan as Jeevannath Dinanath Tripathi, Meena's second paternal uncle.
Satish Shah as Somnath "Pappi" Dinanath Tripathi, Meena's youngest paternal uncle.
Himani Shivpuri as Shanno Nath Dinanath Tripathi/ Shanno Sunil Mishra, Meena's fraternal aunt.
Shakti Kapoor as Mohan "Babu" Singh, Tripathis' former servant.
Shashi Kiran as Sunil Mishra, Meena's fraternal uncle.
Rita Bhaduri as Mallika Vidyanath Tripathi, Meena's eldest paternal aunt.
Shagufta Ali as Sugandha Jeevannath Tripathi, Meena's second paternal aunt.
Rakesh Bedi as Sharmaji, Dhanraj's secretary.
Omkar Kapoor as Shekhar Jeevannath Tripathi, Meena's paternal cousin.
Harish Kumar as Arvind Sharma, Meena's prospective husband. (special appearance)

Soundtrack

Anand–Milind came up with a chart-topping score yet again for a Govinda-David Dhawan film. The music, especially the song, "Sona Kitna Sona Hain", emerged a winner on countdown shows and is remembered till date. The other songs also gained mass popularity like "Saaton Janam", "Maine Paidal", "Main Tujko Bahga Laya", "Mohobbat Ki Nahi" and "U. P. Wala". The songs were extremely popular among the masses and are often heard even now. Poornima earned herself a Zee Cine Awards nomination for "Sona Kitna Sona Hain", but she lost to Lata Mangeshkar for Dil To Pagal Hai.

References

External links

1997 films
1990s Hindi-language films
Films scored by Anand–Milind
Films directed by David Dhawan
Hindi films remade in other languages
Indian comedy-drama films
1997 comedy-drama films